Globivenus is a genus of bivalves belonging to the family Veneridae.

The genus has cosmopolitan distribution, except Subarctic regions.

Species
Species:

Globivenus banaconensis 
Globivenus callimorpha 
Globivenus capricornea 
Globivenus effossa 
Globivenus embrithes 
Globivenus fordii 
Globivenus foresti 
Globivenus helenae 
Globivenus isocardia 
Globivenus kempfi 
Globivenus lepidoglypta 
Globivenus libellus 
Globivenus listeroides 
Globivenus magdalenae 
Globivenus mindoroensis 
Globivenus neozelanica 
Globivenus orientalis 
Globivenus pereffossa 
Globivenus rigida 
Globivenus rugatina 
Globivenus snellii 
Globivenus strigillina 
Globivenus toreuma

References

Veneridae
Bivalve genera